Girolamo Buratti (active 1580) was an Italian painter of the late Renaissance, active in his native Ascoli Piceno. Here, in the Santa Maria della Carità Church, he painted on the walls a cycle of frescoes representing "Histories of Exodus" and the Presepio for main altar.

References

People from Ascoli Piceno
16th-century Italian painters
Italian male painters
Italian Renaissance painters
Year of birth missing
Year of death missing